J. Clarence "Clancy" McDermott (c. 1920 – December 2007) was a footballer from Northern Ireland who played in the Irish League with Glentoran and Coleraine from 1939-1963. With the Glens, he won the Gold Cup in 1941/42, and with Coleraine he also won the Gold Cup (1958/59) as well as the City Cup in 1954/55. He was capped once by the Irish League in 1949. He was the Ulster Footballer of the Year for the 1958/59 season.

References

Sources
Northern Ireland's Footballing Greats
Clancy McDermott's obituary

External links
Profile ar Coleraine F.C. official site

Association footballers from Northern Ireland
NIFL Premiership players
Ulster Footballers of the Year
Glentoran F.C. players
Coleraine F.C. players
Association footballers from Belfast
2007 deaths
Year of birth uncertain

Association footballers not categorized by position